José Carlos Pereira do Nascimento (born 19 March 1965), known as Zé Carlos or José Carlos, is a Brazilian former professional footballer who played as a defender.

Career
Zé Carlos scored 25 goals for Porto in all competitions as a defender.

He scored in four consecutive Champions League matches in the 1992–93 season.

Honours
Source: 

Flamengo
Copa União: 1987

Porto
Primeira Liga: 1989–90, 1991–92, 1992–93, 1994–95, 1995–96
Taça de Portugal: 1993–94
Supertaça Cândido de Oliveira: 1993, 1994

References

External links
 

1965 births
Living people
Sportspeople from Goiânia
Association football defenders
Brazilian footballers
Brazilian expatriate footballers
Campeonato Brasileiro Série A players
Primeira Liga players
CR Flamengo footballers
FC Porto players
Gil Vicente F.C. players
CR Vasco da Gama players
C.S. Marítimo players
Expatriate footballers in Portugal
Brazilian expatriate sportspeople in Portugal